In zoological nomenclature, a nomen oblitum (plural: nomina oblita; Latin for "forgotten name") is a disused scientific name which has been declared to be obsolete (figuratively 'forgotten') in favour of another 'protected' name.

In its present meaning, the nomen oblitum came into being with the fourth, 1999, edition of the International Code of Zoological Nomenclature. After 1 January 2000, a scientific name may be formally declared to be a nomen oblitum when it has been shown not to have been used as a valid name within the scientific community since 1899, and when it is either a senior synonym (there is also a more recent name which applies to the same taxon, and which is in common use) or a homonym (it is spelled the same as another name, which is in common use), and when the preferred junior synonym or homonym has been shown to be in wide use in 50 or more publications in the past few decades. Once a name has formally been declared to be a nomen oblitum, the now obsolete name is to be 'forgotten'. By the same act, the next available name must be declared to be protected under the title nomen protectum. Thereafter it takes precedence.

An example is the case of the scientific name for the leopard shark. Despite the name Mustelus felis being the senior synonym, an error in recording the dates of publication resulted in the widespread use of Triakis semifasciata as the leopard shark's scientific name. After this long-standing error was discovered, T. semifasciata was made the valid name (as a nomen protectum) and Mustelus felis was declared invalid (as a nomen oblitum).

Use in taxonomy
The designation nomen oblitum has been used relatively frequently to keep the priority of old, sometimes disused names, and, controversially, often without establishing that a name actually meets the criteria for the designation. Some taxonomists have regarded the failure to properly establish the nomen oblitum designation as a way to avoid doing taxonomic research or to retain a preferred name regardless of priority. When discussing the taxonomy of North American birds, Rea (1983) stated that "...Swainson's [older but disused] name must stand unless it can be demonstrated conclusively to be a nomen oblitum (a game some taxonomists play to avoid their supposed fundamental principle, priority)."

Banks and Browning (1995) responded directly to Rea's strict application of ICZN rules for determining nomina oblita, stating: "We believe that the fundamental obligation of taxonomists is to promote stability, and that the principle of priority is but one way in which this can be effected. We see no stability in resurrecting a name of uncertain basis that has been used in several different ways to replace a name that has been used uniformly for most of a century."

See also
 Glossary of scientific naming
 Nomen conservandum
 Nomen dubium
 Nomen novum
 Nomen nudum

References

Taxonomy (biology)
Zoological nomenclature
Latin biological phrases